That’s What Life Is All About is a 1975 vinyl album recorded by Bing Crosby for United Artists at Chappells in London in February 1975.  He was accompanied by Pete Moore and his Orchestra.

The songs from the album were included on a 3-CD set called Bing Crosby: The Complete United Artists Sessions issued by EMI Records (7243 59808 2 4) in 1997. This included several previously unreleased alternate takes and studio chat.

Background
In January 1974, Crosby was seriously ill and after two weeks of tests, he underwent three and a half hours of major surgery. Two-fifths of his left lung and an abscess the size of a small orange were removed. The tumor was a rare fungus called nocardia. There were concerns initially that he would not be able to sing again and his recuperation took many months. Record producer Ken Barnes later heard that Crosby was thinking of recording again and he quickly presented his credentials and eventually met Crosby on September 9, 1974 at the singer’s home. Arrangements were soon made for two albums to be made in London. As a prelude, two songs were recorded with Johnny Mercer and a rhythm section at Mercer’s own “Heritage” recording studio at Oak Street in Burbank, California on October 17, 1974. Orchestra was added in February 1975.

Crosby flew to London on February 18 and that afternoon visited the Chappells recording studio. He was shown the vocal booth where he would be singing but said that he did not want to work in that way. He wanted to be with the band and said, “I didn’t come seven thousand miles to sing to a pane of glass.” This worried sound engineer John Timperley who was concerned about separation problems because of the large orchestra which was to be used. Crosby was adamant however and, in the event, he successfully overcame the problems of recording in front of a full orchestra.

Over a period of eight days, Crosby, in six sessions, recorded twenty five tracks. Eleven of the tracks, plus the two Crosby had recorded with Johnny Mercer were issued on this LP. Thirteen, with the addition of another song to be recorded in 1976, were issued on an LP called At My Time of Life and the final recording was included with eleven others made in 1976 and issued on an LP called Beautiful Memories.

Personnel
Rhythm section - October 17, 1974: Jimmy Rowles (piano); Joe Mondragon (bass) and Alvin Stoller (drums).
Full details are not given for the recordings in February 1975 but the 3-CD set Bing Crosby: The Complete United Artists Sessions mentions the following:

"The Best Things in Life Are Free" - Kenny Baker, muted trumpet

"Have a Nice Day" - Tommy Reilly, harmonica

Reception
The album entered the UK album charts on September 20, 1975 and peaked at No. 28 during its 6 weeks in the charts.

The UK magazine The Gramophone reviewed the album saying: "...Crosby’s voice has lost very little power and presence despite his septuagenarian status and the major lung operation he underwent last year, and, estimably aided by the outstanding arrangements of Pete Moore and the first-class orchestra directed by Moore, this album is another landmark in a uniquely long and distinguished career.

Variety commented: “All right, Bing Crosby's voice isn’t as great as it was 20, 30 or whatever years ago. So what? He’s a brilliant stylist and there’s plenty of voice left as he demonstrates here on 13 tracks…”

Track listing

References 

1975 albums
Bing Crosby albums
United Artists Records albums
Albums produced by Ken Barnes (writer)